Stenoptinea cyaneimarmorella is a moth belonging to the family Tineidae. The species was first described by Pierre Millière in 1854.

It is native to Europe.

References

Meessiinae
Taxa named by Pierre Millière
Moths described in 1854